Kenneth C. Millett (born 1941) is a professor of mathematics at the University of California, Santa Barbara. His research concerns low-dimensional topology, knot theory, and the applications of knot theory to DNA structure; his initial is the "M" in the name of the HOMFLY polynomial.

Millett graduated from the Massachusetts Institute of Technology in 1963 with a bachelor's degree in mathematics. He earned his Ph.D. in 1967 from the University of Wisconsin under the supervision of Edward R. Fadell. After short-term instructor positions at the University of California, Los Angeles and MIT, he joined the UCSB faculty in 1969 and was promoted to professor in 1979.

Millett won the Carl B. Allendoerfer Award of the Mathematical Association of America in 1989 and the Chauvenet Prize in 1991 for a paper on knot theory with W. B. R. Lickorish.
He became a fellow of the American Association for the Advancement of Science in 2000. In 2012, he became one of the inaugural fellows of the American Mathematical Society.

Selected publications
with Eric J. Rawdon, Andrzej Stasiak: 
with Michal Jamroz, Wanda Niemyska, Eric J. Rawdon, Andrzej Stasiak, Piotr Sułkowski, Joanna I. Sulkowska: 
with Joanna I. Sułkowska, Eric J. Rawdon, Jose N. Onuchic, Andrzej Stasiak: 
with D. Jonish:  
with P. Freyd, D. Yetter, J. Hoste, W. B. R. Lickorish and A. Ocneanu:

References

External links
Home page
Google scholar profile

1941 births
Living people
20th-century American mathematicians
21st-century American mathematicians
Topologists
Massachusetts Institute of Technology School of Science alumni
University of California, Santa Barbara faculty
Fellows of the American Association for the Advancement of Science
Fellows of the American Mathematical Society